Raymond Thomas Odierno  (8 September 1954 – 8 October 2021) was an American military officer who served as a four-star general of the United States Army and as the 38th chief of staff of the Army. Prior to his service as chief of staff, Odierno commanded United States Joint Forces Command from October 2010 until its disestablishment in August 2011. He served as Commanding General, United States Forces – Iraq and its predecessor, Multi-National Force – Iraq, from September 2008 through September 2010.

Early life and education
Raymond Thomas Odierno, of Italian descent, was born on 8 September 1954 in Dover, New Jersey, the son of Helen and Raymond J. Odierno. He grew up in Rockaway, New Jersey, and attended Morris Hills High School, graduating in 1972, followed by the United States Military Academy at West Point, where he graduated in June 1976 with a Bachelor of Science degree. He later received a Master of Science degree in nuclear effects engineering from North Carolina State University and a Master of Arts degree in national security and strategy from the Naval War College.

Career
Odierno was commissioned as an officer upon his graduation from West Point in 1976. Over his career, he was stationed in Germany, Saudi Arabia, the Balkans, and the US.

Iraq War 
Odierno served three tours in Iraq between 2003 and 2010. He commanded the 4th Infantry Division during the 2003 US-led invasion of Iraq, with headquarters at Tikrit. According to Thomas E. Ricks, the Division employed aggressive tactics under his leadership; according to a 2008 profile of Odierno in The Guardian, the Division followed an "iron-fist strategy" under his command. Odierno replaced Peter W. Chiarelli as commander of Multi-National Corps – Iraq in 2006. As commander, Odierno promoted the Iraq War troop surge of 2007 as an alternative to the then-prevailing military strategy. His tactics as commander were less "confrontational" than those he had employed as commander of the 4th Infantry Division. Odierno oversaw the surge from December 2006 to March 2008. In September 2008, Odierno took over from David Petraeus as commander of US forces in Iraq. According to then-Secretary of Defense Robert Gates, Odierno's experience as commander during the surge suited him to succeed Petraeus. Later that year, Odierno announced a "subtle shift" in US military operations in Iraq, whereby the United States would seek the approval of Iraq's government before engaging in combat.

Army leadership 

On 30 May 2011, Odierno was nominated to be Army Chief of Staff. He was confirmed to take over from General Martin E. Dempsey on 7 September 2011, and sworn in as 38th Army chief of staff later that day. In 2014, Odierno submitted a budget request for 520,000 active-duty soldiers, and said that the bare minimum was 450,000, which would, however, be at a "high risk to meet one major war". As chief of staff, Odierno said in a 2015 interview with The Daily Telegraph that he was "very concerned" about a decline in the United Kingdom's military spending. In August 2015, Odierno retired from the Army after 39 years of service.

Post-military activities
In January 2017, Odierno was named chairman of USA Football, a national organization that promotes youth football. He was named chairman and alternate governor of the National Hockey League's Florida Panthers on 12 October 2017. In January 2019, he was selected to serve a three-year term on the College Football Playoff selection committee. In July 2021, he was selected as a member of the board of trustees at North Carolina State University.

Assignments
Source:

Promotions
 United States Military Academy – Class of 1976

Officer assignments

Awards and honors 
Odierno received the Naval War College Distinguished Graduate Leadership Award in 2009. In 2012, Odierno received the Ellis Island Medal of Honor.

Personal life

Odierno and his wife had three children and four grandchildren. His son, retired U.S. Army Captain Anthony K. Odierno, is an Iraq War veteran who lost his left arm to a rocket-propelled grenade.

Odierno died on 8 October 2021, from cancer at the age of 67. In January 2022, funeral services were held privately followed by interment at Arlington National Cemetery.

References

Sources

External links

 
 
 

|-

|-

|-

|-

1954 births
2021 deaths
American people of Italian descent
College Football Playoff Selection Committee members
Florida Panthers executives
Military leaders of the Iraq War
Military personnel from New Jersey
North Carolina State University alumni
People from Dover, New Jersey
United States Army Chiefs of Staff
United States Army personnel of the Iraq War
United States Army generals
United States Army War College alumni
United States Military Academy alumni
Burials at Arlington National Cemetery
Recipients of the Distinguished Service Medal (US Army)
Recipients of the Defense Distinguished Service Medal
Recipients of the Defense Superior Service Medal
Recipients of the Legion of Merit
Recipients of the Meritorious Service Medal (United States)
Deaths from cancer in North Carolina